United States gubernatorial elections were held in 1890, in 27 states, concurrent with the House and Senate elections, on November 4, 1890 (except in Alabama, Arkansas, Georgia, Idaho, Maine, Oregon, Rhode Island, Vermont and Wyoming, which held early elections).

In New Hampshire, the newly elected Governor's term began in the January following the election for the first time, rather than in the following June as previously.

Idaho and Wyoming held their first gubernatorial elections on achieving statehood.

Results

See also 
1890 United States elections

References

Notes

Bibliography 
 
 
 
 
 

 
November 1890 events